Strategic health authorities (SHA) were part of the structure of the National Health Service in England between 2002 and 2013. Each SHA was responsible for managing performance, enacting directives and implementing health policy as required by the Department of Health at a regional level.

History 
In 2002, the existing regional health authorities were renamed and merged to form 28 new strategic health authorities, under the National Health Service Reform and Health Care Professions Act 2002. This was the first time that the regional tier in the NHS reported directly to the centre rather than having a board and non-executive members.

The SHA chief executives were appointed after a wide-ranging search and selection process and did not represent continuity with the previous regions, not least because CEOs were allocated to areas they were not generally familiar with. A number of the new CEOs had previously been health authority CEOs or CEOs of large trusts, rather than being on the traditional path.

The role of the SHAs was set out in Shifting the Balance of Power within the NHS – Securing Delivery and included the following:

The goal was to create a coherent strategic framework for the development of services across the full range of local NHS organisations, including:

 Performance management
 Brokering solutions where there were disputes
 Building capacity and supporting performance improvement
 Preparing and delivering cohesive strategies for capital investment
 Working with workforce confederations (in some unspecified way)
 Ensuring effective professional leadership across their area.

Evolution 
A pivotal event seems to have been a loss of financial control in 2005/6 and a failure of the management system to respond quickly or firmly enough. This, combined with some ministerial ambivalence about the effectiveness of SHAs and a promise in the 2005 election to reduce NHS management spending, led to Patricia Hewitt, Secretary of State for Health to announce that, following an NHS consultation which ended in March 2006, the SHAs were to be reorganized. They were reduced to ten in number by the Strategic Health Authorities (Establishment and Abolition) (England) Order 2006, as amended, and this was expected to produce substantial financial savings.

At the same time there were other important changes that had implications for the functioning of SHAs:

 Span of control – the number of PCTs was reduced to 152 from 302 in 2002 (although there had been a continuous process of mergers).  At the same time, an increasing number of providers were achieving foundation trust status. Both of these changed the nature of the relationships of the intermediate layer to local organisations. 
 Reporting relationships – the role of CEO of the NHS and Permanent Secretary of the DH were separated and the reporting relationship for SHA CEOs moved to directly report to the NHS CEO.
 Top team changes – the top management team was reduced in size from over 50 during the early part of the period to a much more manageable number, and this was accompanied by the development of procedures to reduce the traffic of policies, instructions and requests for information to the service from the centre. 

The period from 2006 saw financial control being restored and key targets were generally achieved. However, further questions about the effectiveness of SHAs and the regulatory process more generally were raised by the 2008 scandal at Mid Staffordshire Hospitals Foundation Trust.

During 2009, SHAs were subject to an assurance process to examine their performance, role in developing their systems and to give developmental feedback.  David Nicholson, NHS Chief Executive, said that the recession was one of several factors that had changed the context: "Part of the reason for doing it is that the SHAs' responsibilities are changing as we speak", he said at the time.

SHAs in this period were expected to develop a more directly strategic approach than was the case in the earlier period, following the launch of Lord Darzi's 'Next Stage Review' report in 2008. There were some examples of successful strategic changes being introduced e.g. the implementation of trauma networks, the redesign of stroke services in London, and changes to the shape of services in Manchester, But many strategic issues remained unresolved. This was not helped by the period having an election followed by the introduction of stricter controls on reconfiguration by the incoming government and then an almost two-year period of uncertainty when the government announced its intention to abolish SHAs in May 2010. This led to SHAs being 'clustered' from ten to four in October 2011.

Abolition 
Strategic health authorities and primary care trusts were abolished on 31 March 2013 as part of the Health and Social Care Act 2012. Facilities owned by SHAs were transferred to NHS Property Services, and their public health functions to Public Health England.

Role 
Each SHA area contained various NHS trusts which took responsibility for running or commissioning local NHS services, and the SHA was responsible for strategic supervision of these services. The types of trust included: 
 Hospital trust
 Ambulance services trust
 NHS care trust
 Mental health trust
 NHS primary care trust (PCT)
The SHAs had the board and governance structures common to all NHS trusts.

After 1 July 2006
The ten SHAs established on 1 July 2006, and abolished on 31 March 2013, were:

NHS East of England (East of England region)
NHS East Midlands (East Midlands region)
NHS London (London)
NHS North East (North East region)
NHS North West (North West region)
NHS South Central
NHS South East Coast
NHS South West (South West region)
NHS West Midlands (West Midlands region)
NHS Yorkshire and the Humber (Yorkshire and the Humber region)

These SHAs are coterminous with government office regions, except that the large South East England region is divided into two: South Central and South East Coast.

Before 2006 reorganisation

 Avon, Gloucestershire and Wiltshire SHA
 Bedfordshire and Hertfordshire SHA
 Birmingham and The Black Country SHA (West Midlands minus Coventry)
 Cheshire and Merseyside SHA
 County Durham and Tees Valley SHA
 Cumbria and Lancashire SHA
 Dorset and Somerset SHA
 Essex SHA
 Greater Manchester SHA
 Hampshire and Isle of Wight SHA
 Kent and Medway SHA
 Leicestershire, Northamptonshire and Rutland SHA
 Norfolk, Suffolk and Cambridgeshire SHA
 North and East Yorkshire and Northern Lincolnshire SHA
 North Central London SHA
 North West London SHA
 North East London SHA
 Northumberland, Tyne and Wear SHA
 Shropshire and Staffordshire SHA
 South East London SHA
 South West London SHA
 South West Peninsula SHA
 South Yorkshire SHA
 Surrey and Sussex SHA (Surrey, East Sussex, West Sussex)
 Thames Valley SHA (Oxfordshire, Berkshire, Buckinghamshire)
 Trent SHA (Derbyshire, Nottinghamshire, Lincolnshire)
 West Midlands South SHA (Warwickshire, Worcestershire, Herefordshire, Coventry) †
 West Yorkshire SHA

† known as the 'Coventry, Warwickshire, Herefordshire and Worcestershire SHA until 2004.

The London boundaries were:

 North Central London – Barnet, Camden, Enfield, Haringey, Islington
 North East London – Barking and Dagenham, City, Hackney, Havering, Newham, Redbridge, Tower Hamlets, Waltham Forest
 North West London – Brent, Ealing, Hammersmith and Fulham, Kensington and Chelsea, Harrow, Hillingdon, Hounslow, Westminster
 South East London – Bexley, Bromley, Greenwich, Lambeth, Lewisham, Southwark
 South West London – Croydon, Kingston, Merton, Richmond, Wandsworth, Sutton

These SHAs were replaced by a single London SHA in 2006.

See also 

Sustainability and transformation plan – a 2016 reorganisation of NHS England

References

Further reading 

National Health Service (England)
2002 establishments in England
Government agencies established in 2002
2013 disestablishments in England
Defunct National Health Service organisations
Former subdivisions of England
Research organisations in England